Greek National Road 16 (abbreviated as EO16) is a single carriageway road (throughout most of its length) in northern Greece. It connects Thessaloniki with Ierissos in Chalkidiki.
At its beginning in Thessaloniki, it forms the Georgikis Scholis Highway, with three lanes in each direction, passing through one of the city's main commercial districts.

Route
The road passes through the following places:
Thessaloniki
Vasilika
Arnaia
Stratoni
Ierissos

16
Roads in Central Macedonia